In the de facto autonomous Rojava region of northern Syria, the first local elections took place on Friday, 13 March 2015. The municipal governments in the three predominantly Kurdish cantons Cizîrê, Kobanî and Afrin were to be elected.

Election

In Cizîrê canton, 160 polling stations were opened and, according to the Rojava High Election Commission, 565 candidates stood for the twelve municipal councils of Dêrik, Girkê Legê, Tirbespiyê, East and West Qamişlo, Amûdê, Dirbêsiyê, Serêkaniyê, Hesekê, Til Koçer, Çilaxa and Ebu Raseyn. Of the 565 candidates, 237 were cited to be women, and apart from the majority being Kurdish, 39 candidates referring to themselves as Syriac/Assyrian/Qeldani, 28 Arabs and one Chechen stood for the election. In Tell Tamer (Girê Xurma), the election had to be postponed as Islamic State of Iraq and the Levant (ISIL) troops attacked the town with mortars.

There are no results available in the internet.

Reactions
The Kurdish National Council (KNC) boycotted the elections, and a spokesperson for the Iraqi Kurdistan Regional Government criticized the elections as being in contradiction to the Duhok Agreement. On the other hand, Syrian Information Minister Omran Zoghbi announced that his government considered recognizing the Kurdish autonomy "within the law and constitution."

See also
 2017 Northern Syria local elections

References

2015 in the Autonomous Administration of North and East Syria
Elections in Syria
Politics of the Autonomous Administration of North and East Syria